Dialogic is an American multinational technology company headquartered in Parsippany, New Jersey, United States, with operations in over 25 countries. Dialogic provides a cloud-optimized communications technology for real-time communications media, applications, and infrastructure to service providers, enterprises, and developers. Dialogic products are sold directly, as well as through a network of distributors, resellers, and partners, and supplied to OEMs.

History
Dialogic was founded in 1983 in Parsippany, New Jersey by three engineers, Nicholas Zwick and James Shinn, both of whom had worked for Advanced Micro Devices, and Kenneth Burkhardt, formerly with Unisys. In 1999, at the height of the dot-com era, the company was acquired by Intel for $780 million and was run as the Media & Signaling Division. In October 2006, Eicon bought the Media & Signaling Division of Intel and then changed its name back to Dialogic.

Since the formation of the new Dialogic, other competitors in the same industry have been acquired and merged into the company, including NMS Communications and Cantata.  The latter was itself a collection of companies including Brooktrout and the Excel Switching Corporation.

In May 2010, Dialogic announced a merger with San Jose, California-based Veraz Networks, a company specializing in softswitch and compression technology. The resulting company would retain the name Dialogic. That same year, Dialogic moved its headquarters to Milpitas, California.

On November 24, 2014, Dialogic was acquired by Novacap TMT IV, L.P., a Canadian private equity firm. They moved the headquarters back to Parsippany, New Jersey.

On February 9, 2016, Dialogic Corp announced the completed acquisition of Apex Communications, a supplier of global real-time communications applications for service providers and enterprise networks. The company launched an application development practice for networked, premises and cloud-based applications. The line of applications include WebRTC, unified communications, IVR, on-demand voicemail and cloud-based PBX.

On January 9, 2018, Sangoma Technologies Corporation acquired all key assets of the Converged Communication Division (CCD) from Dialogic Corporation. By divesting its CCD hardware business, Dialogic became a software-centric company.

The remaining company, under the name Dialogic Group, was acquired on January 2, 2020, by Enghouse Systems Ltd of Markham, Ontario.

Products
Dialogic designs, sells and supports real-time communications media, applications, and infrastructure solutions to communications service providers, enterprises, and developers.

Its products include media servers, gateways and boards; load balancers, communications applications, softswitches, diameter signaling controllers, session border controllers, signaling stacks and software, fax boards and FoIP software, and bandwidth optimization solutions.

References

Companies established in 1983
Software companies based in New Jersey
Telecommunications companies of the United States
VoIP companies of the United States
Privately held companies of the United States
Telecommunications equipment vendors
Software companies of Canada
Telecommunications companies of Canada
Privately held companies of Canada
Parsippany-Troy Hills, New Jersey
Companies based in Morris County, New Jersey
Software companies of the United States